VVG may refer to:

Verhoeff–Van Gieson stain
Verden Transport Company (Verdener Verkehrsgesellschaft)
Violent video game
Vincent van Gogh